Traffic Continues is an album by composer and guitarist Fred Frith featuring the Ensemble Modern, Zeena Parkins and Ikue Mori, which was released on the Winter & Winter label. The album features a suite dedicated to cellist Tom Cora built around samples of his playing from Etymology (Rarefaction, 1997).

Reception

In his review for AllMusic, Dave Lynch called the album "one of the strongest statements of Frith's career, a finely balanced work that contains concert hall and street sensibilities in equal measure". PopMatters observed "this is adventurous and often heady music that is not for all tastes. But then, it’s not really meant to be either since this is music that sets out to challenge what is accepted as much as what is acceptable". The All About Jazz review noted "Traffic Continues is a fine and noteworthy edition to Fred Frith’s extensive catalog and ongoing legacy. Besides possessing a remarkably individualistic voice as a powerful and quite influential technician, Frith’s perceptive intellect shines forth on this multifaceted and curiously interesting recording".

Track listing
All compositions by Fred Frith

Traffic Continues
 "Inadvertent Introduction" – 0:53   
 "First Riddle" – 2:30   
 "Traffic II" – 4:25   
 "Third Riddle" – 2:13   
 "Lourdement Gai" – 1:06   
 "Traffic III/Traffic I" – 2:17   
 "Freeway/Shadow of a Tree on Sand" – 5:28   
 "Fragile Finale" – 9:55   
Traffic Continues II: Gusto (For Tom Cora)

Personnel
Fred Frith – guitar, musical director
Zeena Parkins – harp (tracks 9–21)
Ikue Mori – drum machines (tracks 9–21)
Ensemble Modern
Uwe Dierksen – trombone
Roland Diry – clarinet
Thomas Fichter – double bass, electric bass
Heinz Huber – accordion (tracks 9–21)
Michael M. Kasper – cello
Freya Kirby, Hilary Sturt – violin
Susan Knight – viola
Hermann Kretzschmar – piano, sampler
Catherine Milliken – oboe, bass oboe, English horn
Bruce Nockles – trumpet
Rumi Ogawa-Helferich – percussion, cymbalom
Franck Ollu – horn, conductor 
Rainer Roemer – percussion
Noriko Shimada – bassoon, contrabassoon
Wolfgang Styri – saxophone, contrabass clarinet
Dietmar Wiesner – flute, bass flute, piccolo

References

Winter & Winter Records albums
Fred Frith albums
2000 albums